Glacinei Martins da Silva (born 19 September 1973), professionally known as Inca, is a Brazilian former professional footballer who played as a midfielder.

Career
In 2010, Inca was suspended for a month for doping.

In June 2012 he re-signed for Sportivo San Lorenzo.

Honours
Cerro Porteño
 Paraguayan Primera División 2003, 2004, 2005

Nacional
 Paraguayan Primera División: 2008

References

External links
 
 

1973 births
Living people
Brazilian footballers
Association football midfielders
Paraguayan Primera División players
Cerro Porteño players
Club Olimpia footballers
Club Nacional footballers
Club Sol de América footballers
Club Sportivo San Lorenzo footballers
Brazilian expatriate footballers
Brazilian expatriate sportspeople in Paraguay
Expatriate footballers in Paraguay
Footballers from São Paulo